Ricardo Cruz (born 9 April 1946) is a Salvadoran racewalker. He competed in the men's 50 kilometres walk at the 1968 Summer Olympics.

References

1946 births
Living people
Athletes (track and field) at the 1968 Summer Olympics
Salvadoran male racewalkers
Olympic athletes of El Salvador
Place of birth missing (living people)